Rasbora amplistriga is a species of ray-finned fish in the genus Rasbora. It inhabits forest streams in the Mekong basin south of Khone Falls as well as coastal basins of south-eastern Thailand.

References 

Rasboras
Fish of the Mekong Basin
Fish of Cambodia
Fish of Laos
Fish of Thailand
Taxa named by Maurice Kottelat
Fish described in 2000